Doctor Who and the Daleks  may refer to:

Doctor Who and the Daleks, a novelisation of the television serial The Daleks
Dr. Who and the Daleks, a film starring Peter Cushing based on the television serial The Daleks